The Singing Cop may refer to:

 The Singing Cop (film), a British film directed by Arthur B. Woods
 Daniel Rodríguez (born 1964), American singer known at The Singing Cop